The South Australian Railways Gb Class locomotives were built by Robert Stephenson and Company in 1874 and 1878 for the Glenelg Railway Company, later being acquired by the South Australian Railways (SAR) on 16 December 1899. The engines were sold to the Adelaide Glenelg & Suburban Railway Company as No. 4 and 5, then subsequently sold to the Glenelg Railway Company in November 1881 with the same numbers. When the SAR purchased the Glenelg Railway Company in 1899, they were classed Gb and renumbered 158 and 159. No. 158 was scrapped in December 1904, while No. 159 persisted until 21 February 1916, then ultimately scrapped in 1922.

References

Gb
Broad gauge locomotives in Australia
Robert Stephenson and Company locomotives
4-4-0T locomotives
Railway locomotives introduced in 1874
Passenger locomotives
Scrapped locomotives